In healthcare, a change-of-shift report is a meeting between healthcare providers at the change of shift in which vital information about and responsibility for the patient is provided from the off-going provider to the on-coming provider (Groves, Manges, Scott-Cawiezell, 2016). Other names for change-of-shift report include handoff, shift report, handover, or sign-out. Change-of-shift report is key to inpatient care because healthcare providers (nurses, physicians, nursing assistants etc.) are essential to providing around the clock care.

Nursing change-of-shift report 
During report, the outgoing nurses discuss with the oncoming nurses the condition of each patient and any changes that have occurred to the patient during the shift. The purpose is not to cover all details recorded in the patient's medical record, but to summarize individual patient progress. The content of the report often depends on the local organization.

Issues with report 
While report is necessary in order to communicate important information between nurses, various problems are posed by the giving of report.
 Nurses in many places are legally not permitted to leave the facility until the provider has given report to the next shift. "Walking off the job" may be considered abandonment, which may be grounds for revocation of the nurse's license. At the same time, facilities are not legally required in all places to pay nurses for the extra time beyond their shift they are forced to stay over to complete report. It is not uncommon for nurses to attend report in their own time before and after a shift.
 While privacy laws require report to be given in a location where unauthorized people cannot hear the report (patients and authorized visitors for that patient are allowed to hear their report, but patients and visitors are not allowed to hear reports for other patients), some facilities prohibit family members from visiting patients during report times.  In contrast, some facilities require shift reports to take place in front of each affected patient, including authorized visitors.

Nursing Bedside Shift Report and patient safety 
There is evidence to suggest that performing change of shift report at the bedside is key to patient safety. In 2001, the Institute of Medicine stated that "it is in inadequate handoff that safety often fails first." This is because at every change of shift, there is a chance for miscommunication about vital patient information. A specific type of change-of-shift report is Nursing Bedside Shift Report in which the off going nurse provides change-of-shift report to the on coming nurse at the patient's bedside. Since 2013, giving report at the patient bedside has been recommend by the Agency for Healthcare Research and Quality (AHRQ) to improve patient safety. However, it wasn't until recently that it was known how Nursing Bedside Shift Report works to keep patients safe. A qualitative study by the nurse researchers Groves, Manges, and Scott-Cawiezell developed a grounded theory on how bedside nurses can use nursing bedside shift report (NBSR) to keep patients safe. According to Groves et al. (2016) NBSR is used by nurses to keep patients safe by "reducing risk of harm through conveying the patient story from shift to shift." Additionally, NBSR is key to reducing risk of harm because it supports the nurses ability to identify and address risks. Preliminary results from a simulation study found that the way nursing report is structured, can nurses safety oriented behaviors (like checking for pressure ulcers, double checking medications, decreasing room clutter to prevent falls).

See also 
 Follow-the-sun, a reporting style in the software development business where work is handed off to the next shift

References

Sources
 Foundations of Caregiving, published by the American Red Cross

Groves, P. S., Manges, K. A., & Scott-Cawiezell, J. (2016). Handing Off Safety at the Bedside. Clinical nursing research, 1054773816630535.

Nursing